Gary Barone was an American soccer player who earned one cap with the U.S. national team.  He also spent two seasons in the North American Soccer League.

Barone attended SUNY Brockport and was an All Conference soccer player in 1970 and 1971.  He then went on to play with the Rochester Lancers in the North American Soccer League in 1972 and 1974.  He was suspended and the waived by the Lancers due to an incident at a Rochester employment agency.

Barone earned one cap with the U.S. national team in a 2-2 tie with Canada on August 29, 1972 World Cup qualifier.  Barone came on for Barry Barto.

References

External links
 Rochester Lancers stats

American soccer players
United States men's international soccer players
North American Soccer League (1968–1984) players
Rochester Lancers (1967–1980) players
Living people
Association football defenders
Year of birth missing (living people)